The Four States Arena is a 5,600-seat multi-purpose arena in Texarkana, Arkansas. Built in 1985, the venue is located at the Four States Fairgrounds which is within the limits of Bobby Ferguson Park. The arena has been home to the Central Hockey League's Border City Bandits (2000–2001) and a North American Hockey League team sharing the same nickname, the Texarkana Bandits (2003–2006). Through the years, The Four States Arena has hosted many entertainers performing concerts along with a number of annual and seasonal events each year including the rodeo at the Four States Fair each September and the holiday-themed "Mistletoe Fair" in either November or December.

External links 
Four States Fair

Indoor arenas in Arkansas
Indoor ice hockey venues in the United States
Sports venues in Arkansas
Buildings and structures in Texarkana, Arkansas